On 5 June 1965, British Rail Standard Class 7 locomotive 70051 Firth of Forth was hauling a passenger train when a blowback of the fire occurred near Winsford, severely injuring both traincrew. Driver Wallace Oakes managed to safely bring the train to a stand, but both he and fireman Gwilym Roberts were severely injured. Oakes died a week later. He was awarded the George Cross and the Carnegie Hero Trust bronze medal for his actions. Class 86 locomotive 86 260 was later named Wallace Oakes G.C. in his honour.

References

Train and rapid transit fires
Railway accidents and incidents in the United Kingdom
Railway accidents in 1965
Railway accident deaths in England